Peter Williams (born 10 October 1944) is a former Australian rules footballer who played with Fitzroy in the Victorian Football League (VFL).

A Wonthaggi recruit, Williams played seven senior games for Fitzroy, four in the 1965 VFL season and three in the 1966 season. He was used as a half forward and rover.

References

1944 births
Australian rules footballers from Victoria (Australia)
Fitzroy Football Club players
Living people